Dmitry Sergeyevich Grigoryev (born 21 August 1992) is a Paralympic swimmer from Russia competing mainly in category S10 events. At the 2012 Summer Paralympics in London he won three medals, including silver in the 100 metre butterfly. He has represented Russia at three IPC World Championships with a total of five medals won.

Personal history
Grigoryev was born in Moscow, Russia in 1992. After undergoing surgery to remove a tumor from his leg, Grigoryev experienced muscle atrophy and loss of control to the limb.

Career history
Grigoryev took to swimming as an alternative to electo-stimulation after his operation. He first represented Russia at a major international competition at the 2010 IPC Swimming World Championships in Eindhoven. He competed in six events, with his best result being fifth place in his favoured event, the 100m butterfly.

References

Paralympic swimmers of Russia
Swimmers at the 2012 Summer Paralympics
Paralympic silver medalists for Russia
Russian male freestyle swimmers
Living people
1992 births
Medalists at the 2012 Summer Paralympics
World record holders in paralympic swimming
Medalists at the World Para Swimming Championships
Medalists at the World Para Swimming European Championships
Paralympic medalists in swimming
Swimmers at the 2020 Summer Paralympics
Paralympic gold medalists for the Russian Paralympic Committee athletes
Swimmers from Moscow
Russian male butterfly swimmers
Russian male breaststroke swimmers
Russian male medley swimmers
S10-classified Paralympic swimmers
20th-century Russian people
21st-century Russian people